"Let's Call It Quits" is a song by the British rock band Slade, released in 1976 as the second single from their sixth studio album Nobody's Fools. The song was written by lead vocalist Noddy Holder and bassist Jim Lea, and produced by Chas Chandler. It reached No. 11 in the UK, remaining in the charts for seven weeks.

Background
By 1975, Slade began to feel stale, believing they had achieved as much success in the UK and Europe as they could. The band and their manager Chas Chandler decided that their next career move should be to try and crack America. The band agreed to move to there and build a reputation for their live performances from scratch, just as they had in the UK. In between touring, the band recorded their next album, Nobody's Fools, which saw the band move towards a more "American" soul/pop sound in attempt to gain a commercial break on the American charts. The lead single, "In for a Penny", was released in November 1975 and reached No. 11 in the UK, with "Let's Call It Quits" following in January 1976 as the second single. Like its predecessor, it too reached No. 11. It would be Slade's last Top 20 single in the UK for five years.

Upon release, the band suffered legal issues over "Let's Call It Quits" as the American musician Allen Toussaint felt the song was similar to his 1973 track "Brickyard Blues". Although Lea maintained that he had never heard the song, the band settled out of court and agreed to give Toussaint half of the song's royalties. In a 1986 fan club interview, Lea recalled: "We had a court case taken against us once for "Let's Call It Quits" because it sounded like a song called "Brickyard Blues", a song that I had never heard before or since."

Release
"Let's Call It Quits" was released on 7" vinyl by Polydor Records in the UK, Ireland, across Europe, Scandinavia, Yugoslavia and Japan. The B-side, "When the Chips Are Down", was exclusive to the single and would later appear on the band's 2007 compilation B-Sides.

Promotion
A music video was filmed to promote the single, which featured the band performing the song in a room with a black and white chequered floor and surrounded with large mirrors. In the UK, the band performed the song on the TV shows Supersonic and Jim'll Fix It.

Critical reception
Upon release, Record Mirror said the song was one of the band's best, describing it as a "slow, heavy rocker", with "rude words" and "some deliciously lascivious guitar". Caroline Coon of Melody Maker felt the song showed Holder in "marvelous, raucous form". She described the song as a "laidback, slow-rocking number", but added it was "much weaker" than the band's previous work. Sounds said the song was Slade's "best record in ages, with Noddy bellowing tender words of love as only he can". In a retrospective review of Nobody's Fools, Geoff Ginsberg of AllMusic described the song as a "real screamer where Noddy Holder coughs up a great vocal".

Track listing
7" Single
"Let's Call It Quits" - 3:30
"When the Chips are Down" - 4:16

Chart performance

Personnel
Slade
Noddy Holder - lead vocals, guitar
Dave Hill - lead guitar, backing vocals
Jim Lea - bass, backing vocals
Don Powell - drums

Additional personnel
Chas Chandler - producer

References

1976 singles
1976 songs
Slade songs
Songs written by Noddy Holder
Songs written by Jim Lea
Song recordings produced by Chas Chandler
Blues rock songs